Silvio Diliberto (born 16 December 1963) is a former Dutch football player who was also a kicker in American football.

Club career

Association football
During his career in football he played for Sparta, for whom he made his professional debut as a winger in May 1982 against NAC, Roda JC, Haarlem and FC Eindhoven as a converted central defender.

American football
He retired from association football in 1996, but made a comeback in NFL Europe in 1997 - he was kicker for the Amsterdam Admirals from 1997 to 2004.

Managerial career
During his time in American football, Diliberto went into soccer coaching and managed amateur side Hermes-DVS, CVV Zwervers, Germania Teveren and RKSV Groene Ster. In 2011 he moved to Qatar to manage Muaither and later Al-Shamal.

Personal life
Diliberto was born to an Italian father and a Dutch mother.

References

External links
Silvio Diliberto at Voetbal International

1963 births
Living people
Footballers from Rotterdam
Dutch people of Italian descent
Association football central defenders
Dutch footballers
Sparta Rotterdam players
Roda JC Kerkrade players
HFC Haarlem players
FC Eindhoven players
Eredivisie players
Eerste Divisie players
American football placekickers
Amsterdam Admirals players
Dutch players of American football
Footballers who switched code
Dutch football managers
Al-Shamal SC managers
Dutch expatriate football managers
Expatriate football managers in Qatar
Dutch expatriates in Qatar